Hoplitis mocsaryi is a species of bees in the genus Hoplitis.

Description

Range 
From Italy (Calabria, Sicily) east to Samsun / Turkey, north to Moravia, south to Sicily and the Peloponnese. In Turkey only on the Black Sea coast. In Central Europe only proven from Lower Austria and Burgenland (historical and current).

Habitat 
Warm, dry locations with stocks of forage plants, such as flood dams, steppes. From the lowlands to the colline altitude level.

Ecology 
Pollen sources: Oligolectic on Ornithogalum, Asparagaceae family. The main pollen source is Linum austriacum and Linum flavum. The petals of both species are also used in nest building. While Linum species are indispensable for this species, they are otherwise only very occasionally used by wild bees to collect pollen. These are mostly bees of the genus Halictus and Lasioglossum.

Nest building: Nests were found in sandy and steppe soils, sometimes on areas that were fairly densely overgrown with grass.

Flight period: In one generation from April to May.

Etymology 
Dedicated to the Hungarian hymenopterologist Alexander (= Sandor) Mocsáry (1841-1915).

Taxonomy 
Subgenus Lepidandrena HEDICKE, 1933, florivaga group.

References 

Megachilidae
Fauna of Italy